Dyschirius tristis is a species of ground beetle in the subfamily Scaritinae. It was described by Stephens in 1827.

References

tristis
Beetles described in 1827